Joel Suter (born 7 July 1998) is a Swiss cyclist, who currently rides for UCI ProTeam .

At the 2020 Tour du Limousin, he took the lead after finishing second to Fernando Gaviria on stage 2, but lost it the following day. However, he had another podium finish, placing third on the fourth and final stage.

Major results
2016
 3rd Time trial, National Junior Road Championships
2019
 1st Stage 2 (TTT) Tour de l'Avenir
 2nd Paris–Tours Espoirs
 10th Kattekoers
2020
 2nd Time trial, National Under-23 Road Championships
2021
 5th Road race, National Road Championships
2022
 1st  Time trial, National Road Championships
 2nd Trofeo Calvià
2023
 10th Overall Étoile de Bessèges

References

External links

1998 births
Living people
Swiss male cyclists
People from Frutigen-Niedersimmental District
Sportspeople from the canton of Bern